The Bowlus BS-100 Super Albatross is a single seat, mid-wing glider that was designed by Hawley Bowlus in 1938.

Design and development
The Super Albatross was created from a Baby Albatross fuselage pod and tail boom. The wings used the outer panels of the Senior Albatross. The resulting aircraft was of wooden construction, with the wings and tail surfaces covered in aircraft fabric. The tail boom is a metal tube.

Only two examples were constructed. The first was built by Bowlus and features an all-flying horizontal stabilizer. The second was built by Frank Kelsey and has a fixed horizontal stabilizer and flaps in addition to spoilers.

Aircraft on display
National Soaring Museum
US Southwest Soaring Museum

Specifications (Super Albatross)

References

1930s United States sailplanes
Bowlus aircraft
Aircraft first flown in 1938